Nikolaj Szeps-Znaider (born 5 July 1975 in Copenhagen, Denmark) is a Danish violinist and conductor.

Biography
Szeps-Znaider was born in Copenhagen to Polish-Jewish parents. His father had originally emigrated from Poland to Israel, and his mother's family had settled in Denmark before World War II. His teachers have included Milan Vitek and Boris Kuschnir.

In June 1992, Szeps-Znaider won the first prize of the 4th International Carl Nielsen International Music Competition.  In 1995 he was awarded 3rd prize at International Jean Sibelius Violin Competition. In 1997 he became a 1st prize winner of the Queen Elisabeth Music Competition in Brussels.  He continued his violin studies with Dorothy DeLay at the Juilliard School of Music.

In his conducting career, Szeps-Znaider counted Sir Colin Davis among his mentors.  Szeps-Znaider has held principal guest conductor posts with the Swedish Chamber Orchestra and the Mariinsky Theatre Orchestra.  In December 2017, Szeps-Znaider first guest-conducted the Orchestre national de Lyon.  In December 2018, the ONL announced the appointment of Szeps-Znaider as its next music director, effective September 2020, with an initial contract of 4 seasons.

Szeps-Znaider has made commercial recordings for such labels as RCA Victor Red Seal and LSO Live.  His discography includes the following works:
 The complete Mozart Violin Concertos with the London Symphony Orchestra, directed from the violin
 Nielsen: Violin Concerto with Alan Gilbert and the New York Philharmonic
 Elgar: Violin Concerto in B minor, with Sir Colin Davis and the Staatskapelle Dresden
 Brahms and Korngold: violin concertos, with Valery Gergiev and the Vienna Philharmonic
 Beethoven and Mendelssohn: violin concertos, with Zubin Mehta and the Israel Philharmonic
 Prokofiev, Violin Concerto No. 2, and Glazunov, Violin Concerto, with Mariss Jansons and the Bavarian Radio Symphony
 Felix Mendelssohn: Violin Concerto (DVD) with Riccardo Chailly and the Gewandhaus Orchestra
 Brahms: chamber music for violin and piano, with Yefim Bronfman

Szeps-Znaider spent ten years as Founder and Artistic Director of the annual Nordic Music Academy summer school. He is now President of the Carl Nielsen Competition.  He is also Viotti Visiting Professor of Music at the Royal Academy of Music, London.

Szeps-Znaider plays the Guarneri “del Gesu” violin, built in 1741, on extended loan to him by The Royal Danish Theater through the generosity of the VELUX Foundations, the Villum Fonden and the Knud Højgaard Foundation.  Previously played by Fritz Kreisler, the violin is thus known as the "Ex-Kreisler Guarnerius".

References

External links
 Enticott Music Management agency page on Nikokaj Szeps-Znaider
 IMG Artists agency page on Nikokaj Szeps-Znaider
 NPR's First Live Orchestral Webcast, 21 July, 2006
 VC 20 Questions

Danish classical violinists
Male classical violinists
Danish conductors (music)
Male conductors (music)
Jewish classical violinists
Prize-winners of the Queen Elisabeth Competition
Danish people of Polish-Jewish descent
Danish Jews
Musicians from Copenhagen
1975 births
Living people
21st-century conductors (music)
21st-century classical violinists
21st-century male musicians